Amyloid-beta precursor protein (APP) is an integral membrane protein expressed in many tissues and concentrated in the synapses of neurons. It functions as a cell surface receptor and has been implicated as a regulator of synapse formation, neural plasticity, antimicrobial activity, and iron export. It is coded for by the gene APP and regulated by substrate presentation. APP is best known as the precursor molecule whose proteolysis generates amyloid beta (Aβ), a polypeptide containing 37 to 49 amino acid residues, whose amyloid fibrillar form is the primary component of amyloid plaques found in the brains of Alzheimer's disease patients.

Genetics 
Amyloid-beta precursor protein is an ancient and highly conserved protein.  In humans, the gene APP is located on chromosome 21 and contains 18 exons spanning 290 kilobases. Several alternative splicing isoforms of APP have been observed in humans, ranging in length from 639 to 770 amino acids, with certain isoforms preferentially expressed in neurons; changes in the neuronal ratio of these isoforms have been associated with Alzheimer's disease. Homologous proteins have been identified in other organisms such as Drosophila (fruit flies), C. elegans (roundworms), and all mammals. The amyloid beta region of the protein, located in the membrane-spanning domain, is not well conserved across species and has no obvious connection with APP's native-state biological functions.

Mutations in critical regions of amyloid precursor protein, including the region that generates amyloid beta (Aβ), cause familial susceptibility to Alzheimer's disease. For example, several mutations outside the Aβ region associated with familial Alzheimer's have been found to dramatically increase production of Aβ.

A mutation (A673T) in the APP gene protects against Alzheimer's disease.  This substitution is adjacent to the beta secretase cleavage site and results in a 40% reduction in the formation of amyloid beta in vitro.

Structure 

A number of different structural domains that fold mostly on their own have been found in the APP sequence. The extracellular region, much larger than the intracellular region, is divided into the E1 and E2 domains, linked by an acidic domain (AcD); E1 contains two subdomains including a growth factor-like domain (GFLD) and a copper-binding domain (CuBD) interacting tightly together. A serine protease inhibitor domain, absent from the isoform differentially expressed in the brain, is found between acidic region and E2 domain. The complete crystal structure of APP has not yet been solved; however, individual domains have been successfully crystallized, the growth factor-like domain, the copper-binding domain, the complete E1 domain and the E2 domain.

Post-translational processing 
APP undergoes extensive post-translational modification including glycosylation, phosphorylation, sialylation, and tyrosine sulfation, as well as many types of proteolytic processing to generate peptide fragments. It is commonly cleaved by proteases in the secretase family; alpha secretase and beta secretase both remove nearly the entire extracellular domain to release membrane-anchored carboxy-terminal fragments that may be associated with apoptosis. Cleavage by gamma secretase within the membrane-spanning domain after beta-secretase cleavage generates the amyloid-beta fragment; gamma secretase is a large multi-subunit complex whose components have not yet been fully characterized, but include presenilin, whose gene has been identified as a major genetic risk factor for Alzheimer's.

The amyloidogenic processing of APP has been linked to its presence in lipid rafts. When APP molecules occupy a lipid raft region of membrane, they are more accessible to and differentially cleaved by beta secretase, whereas APP molecules outside a raft are differentially cleaved by the non-amyloidogenic alpha secretase. Gamma secretase activity has also been associated with lipid rafts. The role of cholesterol in lipid raft maintenance has been cited as a likely explanation for observations that high cholesterol and apolipoprotein E genotype are major risk factors for Alzheimer's disease.

Biological function 
Although the native biological role of APP is of obvious interest to Alzheimer's research, thorough understanding has remained elusive. Experimental models of Alzheimer's disease are commonly used by researchers to gain better understandings about the biological function of APP in disease pathology and progression.

Synaptic formation and repair 
The most-substantiated role for APP is in synaptic formation and repair; its expression is upregulated during neuronal differentiation and after neural injury. Roles in cell signaling, long-term potentiation, and cell adhesion have been proposed and supported by as-yet limited research. In particular, similarities in post-translational processing have invited comparisons to the signaling role of the surface receptor protein Notch.

APP knockout mice are viable and have relatively minor phenotypic effects including impaired long-term potentiation and memory loss without general neuron loss. On the other hand, transgenic mice with upregulated APP expression have also been reported to show impaired long-term potentiation.

The logical inference is that because Aβ accumulates excessively in Alzheimer's disease its precursor, APP, would be elevated as well.  However, neuronal cell bodies contain less APP as a function of their proximity to amyloid plaques. The data indicate that this deficit in APP results from a decline in production rather than an increase in catalysis.  Loss of a neuron's APP may affect physiological deficits that contribute to dementia.

Somatic recombination

In neurons of the human brain, somatic recombination occurs frequently in the gene that encodes APP.  Neurons from individuals with sporadic Alzheimer's disease show greater APP gene diversity due to somatic recombination than neurons from healthy individuals.

Anterograde neuronal transport 
Molecules synthesized in the cell bodies of neurons must be conveyed outward to the distal synapses. This is accomplished via fast anterograde transport. It has been found that APP can mediate interaction between cargo and kinesin and thus facilitate this transport. Specifically, a short peptide 15-amino-acid sequence from the cytoplasmic carboxy-terminus is necessary for interaction with the motor protein.

Additionally, it has been shown that the interaction between APP and kinesin is specific to the peptide sequence of APP. In a recent experiment involving transport of peptide-conjugated colored beads, controls were conjugated to a single amino acid, glycine, such that they display the same terminal carboxylic acid group as APP without the intervening 15-amino-acid sequence mentioned above. The control beads were not motile, which demonstrated that the terminal COOH moiety of peptides is not sufficient to mediate transport.

Iron export 
A different perspective on Alzheimer's is revealed by a mouse study that has found that APP possesses ferroxidase activity similar to ceruloplasmin, facilitating iron export through interaction with ferroportin; it seems that this activity is blocked by zinc trapped by accumulated Aβ in Alzheimer's.  It has been shown that a single nucleotide polymorphism in the 5'UTR of APP mRNA can disrupt its translation.

The hypothesis that APP has ferroxidase activity in its E2 domain and facilitates export of Fe(II) is possibly incorrect since the proposed ferroxidase site of APP located in the E2 domain does not have ferroxidase activity.

As APP does not possess ferroxidase activity within its E2 domain, the mechanism of APP-modulated iron efflux from ferroportin has come under scrutiny. One model suggests that APP acts to stabilize the iron efflux protein ferroportin in the plasma membrane of cells thereby increasing the total number of ferroportin molecules at the membrane. These iron-transporters can then be activated by known mammalian ferroxidases (i.e. ceruloplasmin or hephaestin).

Hormonal regulation 
The amyloid-β precursor protein (AβPP), and all associated secretases, are expressed early in development and play a key role in the endocrinology of reproduction – with the differential processing of AβPP by secretases regulating human embryonic stem cell (hESC) proliferation as well as their differentiation into neural precursor cells (NPC). The pregnancy hormone human chorionic gonadotropin (hCG) increases AβPP expression and hESC proliferation while progesterone directs AβPP processing towards the non-amyloidogenic pathway, which promotes hESC differentiation into NPC.

AβPP and its cleavage products do not promote the proliferation and differentiation of post-mitotic neurons; rather, the overexpression of either wild-type or mutant AβPP in post-mitotic neurons induces apoptotic death following their re-entry into the cell cycle.  It is postulated that the loss of sex steroids (including progesterone) but the elevation in luteinizing hormone, the adult equivalent of hCG, post-menopause and during andropause drives amyloid-β production and re-entry of post-mitotic neurons into the cell cycle.

Interactions 
Amyloid precursor protein has been shown to interact with:

 APBA1,
 APBA2,
 APBA3,
 APBB1,
 APPBP1,
 APPBP2,
 BCAP31,
 BLMH
 CLSTN1,
 CAV1,
 COL25A1,
 FBLN1,
 GSN,
 HSD17B10, and
 SHC1.

APP interacts with reelin, a protein implicated in a number of brain disorders, including Alzheimer's disease.

References

Further reading

External links 

  GeneReviews/NCBI/NIH/UW entry on Early-Onset Familial Alzheimer Disease
 
 Entrez Gene: APP amyloid beta (A4) precursor protein (peptidase nexin-II, Alzheimer disease)
 

Alzheimer's disease
Single-pass transmembrane proteins
Neurochemistry
Amyloidosis
Precursor proteins